The Roman walls of Lugo (Spanish, Galician: Muralla Romana de Lugo) are the ancient Roman defensive walls stretching  around the Old Town of Lugo, Spain. They were built in the third century AD to defend the ancient Roman town of Lucus Augusti. The fortifications, still largely intact, were declared a UNESCO World Heritage Site in 2000 and are a popular tourist attraction.

Description

Walls
The city walls were built between 263 and 276 A.D. to defend the Roman town of Lucus Augusti (present-day Lugo) against local tribesmen and Germanic invaders. The walls formed part of a complex of fortifications which also included a moat and an intervallum (the clearing between the walls and the city). Not all of the town was enclosed by walls: much of the southeastern part of the town remained unprotected, while in other places unused areas were enclosed by walls. 

The walls consist of internal and external stone facing with a core of earth mixed with gravel, pebbles and worked Roman stone recycled from demolished buildings, cemented with water.

Gates
There are ten gates in the walls: five dating to Roman times; and five added after 1853 to accommodate the expanding town population. The best preserved original gates are the Porta Falsa and the Porta Miña, the latter still has its original vaulted arch set between two towers. Five stairways and a ramp provide access to the parapet walk over the walls. Within the walls, a number of double staircases provide access to the towers from the parapet walk.

Towers
Of the original towers, 49 are still intact, and another 39 have partially survived. The towers were built at irregular intervals along the walls. They consist of two storeys and are mostly semicircular; a few are rectangular. A mix of materials was used for the construction of the towers. Often the base of the tower was constructed of dressed granite, with the remainder in slate.

History

Pilgrim route
During the Middle Ages, pilgrims passed through the gates of the Lugo walls, particularly Porta Miña, on their way to Santiago de Compostela.

Present day
The fortifications were added to UNESCO's World Heritage List in late 2000 as "the finest example of late Roman fortifications in western Europe." The walls have held Spanish monument status (Bien de Interés Cultural) since 1921. In 2007 the walls were twinned with the Great Wall of China during a ceremony attended by China's then-ambassador to Spain, Qiu Xiaoqi.

A walkway over the walls now allows visitors to stroll along the entire length. The town also has a visitor's centre dedicated to the walls, the Centro de Interpretación da Muralla.  Since the inscription of the walls on the World Heritage List in 2000, Lugo holds a popular festival called Arde Lucus each year to celebrate its Roman past.

Gallery

See also

 Roman bridge of Lugo
 List of Roman sites in Spain
 London Wall
 Aurelian Walls
 Servian Wall

References

External links 
 Explore the Roman Walls of Lugo in the UNESCO collection on Google Arts and Culture

260s establishments in the Roman Empire
Lugo
Roman sites in Spain
World Heritage Sites in Spain
Buildings and structures completed in the 3rd century
Roman fortifications in Hispania Tarraconensis
Buildings and structures in the Province of Lugo
Tourist attractions in Galicia (Spain)
Bien de Interés Cultural landmarks in the Province of Lugo
Roman walls in Spain
3rd-century fortifications
Galician culture